The Vital Voices Global Leadership Awards honor international women leaders  in the fields of human rights, economic empowerment, or political reform. The event takes place annually in early spring at the John F. Kennedy Center for the Performing Arts in Washington, D.C.

The 2009 program was named that year's "Most Inspirational Event" by Washington Life Magazine. The 15th annual Global Leadership Awards were held on March 9, 2016.

Past presenters include Ben Affleck, Christiane Amanpour, Federal Deposit Insurance Corporation Chairman Sheila Bair, Candice Bergen, Wolf Blitzer, Laura Bush, United States Secretary of State and Vital Voices co-founder Hillary Clinton, Sally Field, Honorary Co-Chair Senator Kay Bailey Hutchison, Angelina Jolie, Avon CEO Andrea Jung, Angelique Kidjo, Nicholas Kristof, Lisa Ling, Time Inc. CEO Ann S. Moore, Suze Orman, Queen Rania of Jordan, Zain Verjee, board member Diane von Fürstenberg, Reese Witherspoon, Brian Williams, and many others.

Awards
Leadership in Public Life Award (formerly Political Participation Award)
Human Rights Award
Economic Empowerment Award (formerly Economic Opportunity Award)
Fern Holland Award, named in honor of the young lawyer who was killed in Iraq while working to create centers for Iraqi women. The award is given to a woman who works for human rights and women’s empowerment.
Rising Voices Award, given to a young woman leader.
Global Trailblazer
10,000 Women Entrepreneurial Achievement Award, part of a partnership between Vital Voices and Goldman Sachs as an initiative to provide women around the world with entrepreneurial education.

Past recipients

2002
Economic Opportunity Award: Dawn Marole, South Africa
Human Rights Award: Oksana Horbunova, Ukraine
Political Participation Award: Inez McCormack, Northern Ireland
Special Recognition: The Women of Afghanistan (representative: Sadoozai Paneh)

2003: "Voices of Hope in a Time of Global Challenge"
Economic Opportunity Award: Arije Al-Amad, Jordan
Human Rights Award: Saisuree Chutikul, Thailand
Political Participation Award: Anabella de León, Guatemala
Special Recognition: The Women of Israel and the Palestine Territories (representatives: Tamara Barnea and Middle East Nonviolence and Democracy (MEND))

2004: "Changing the Face of Leadership"
Economic Opportunity Award: Reyna McPeck, Venezuela
Human Rights Award: Marina Pisklakova-Parker, Russia
Political Participation Award: Amat al Aleem Ali Alsoswa, Yemen
Fern Holland Award: Fatima Hassan Mohammed Al-Migdadi, Iraq
Special Recognition: The Women of Haiti (representatives: Marie Lucie Bonhomme and Danielle St. Lot, Les Femmes en Démocratie)

2005: "A Call to Action"
Economic Opportunity Award: Jaya Arunachalam, India
Human Rights Award: Mu Sochua, Cambodia
Political Participation Award: Latifa Jbabdi, Morocco
Fern Holland Award: The Women of Ukraine's Orange Revolution (representatives: Nataliya Dmytruk, Oksana Gorbunova, Kateryna Gorbunova, Oksana Yarosh, Yana Deringer, and Ludmila Merlian)

2006
Economic Opportunity Award: Ngozi Okonjo-Iweala, Nigeria
Human Rights Award: Rita Chaikin, Israel
Fern Holland Award: Mukhtaran Mai, Pakistan
Global Trailblazer: Ellen Johnson Sirleaf, Liberia
Special Recognition: The Women of Kuwait (representatives: Lubna Al-Qazi, Lulwa Al-Qatami, Fatima Hussien Al-Essa, Noureya Al-Saddani, Lulwa Al-Mulla, Rola Dashti, and Ghada Al-Khalaf)

2007: "Women Changing Our World"
Economic Opportunity Award: Maria Pacheco, Guatemala
Political Participation Award: Margaret Alva, India
Fern Holland Award: Awut Deng Acuil, Sudan
Global Trailblazer: Muhammad Yunus, Bangladesh
Special Recognition: The Women of China (representatives: Gao Yaojie, Guo Jianmei, Xie Lihua, and Wang Xingjuan)

2008
Human Rights Award: Khin Ohmar and Charm Tong, Burma
Political Participation Award: Laura Alonso, Argentina
Fern Holland Award: Mariane Pearl, France
Global Trailblazer: Sheikha Lubna Al Qasimi, United Arab Emirates
Rising Voices Award: Kakenya Ntaiya, Kenya

2009: "Women Leading Change Across the World"
Human Rights Award: Somaly Mam, Cambodia
Fern Holland Award: Chouchou Namegabe Nabintu and Marceline Kongolo-Bice, Democratic Republic of Congo
Global Trailblazer: Hillary Clinton, United States
Rising Voices Award: Sadiqa Basiri Saleem, Afghanistan
10,000 Women Entrepreneurial Achievement Award: Temituokpe Esisi, Nigeria

2010: "Impact Through Innovation: Women Inspiring Change"
Economic Empowerment Award: Roshaneh Zafar, Pakistan
Human Rights Award: Panmela Castro, Brazil
Leadership in Public Life Award: Afnan Al Zayani, Bahrain
Fern Holland Award: Rebecca Lolosoli, Kenya
Global Trailblazer: Melinda French Gates, United States
10,000 Women Entrepreneurial Achievement Award: Andeisha Farid, Afghanistan

2011
Human Rights Award: Sunitha Krishnan, India
Fern Holland Award: Liron Peleg-Hadomi and Noha Khatieb, Israel
10,000 Women Entrepreneurial Achievement Award: Fatema Akbari, Afghanistan
Global Trailblazer Award: Aung San Suu Kyi, Burma, named "Voice of the Decade."
Leadership in Public Life Award: Kah Walla, Cameroon

2012
Human Rights Award: Rosana Schaack, Liberia
Leadership in Public Life Award: Ruth Zavaleta Salgado, Mexico
Fern Holland Award: Samar Minallah Kahn, Pakistan
Economic Empowerment Award: Adimaimalaga Tafuna’i, Samoa
Global Trailblazer Award:  Shatha Al-Harazi, Manal Alsharif, Salwa Bugaighis, Marianne Ibrahim and Amira Yahyaoui

2013
Tep Vanny, Cambodia, Vital Voices Global Leadership Award

References
http://prideofpakistan.com/whoiswhodetail.php?name=RoshanehZafar&id=586

Awards established in 2002
Human rights awards
2002 establishments in Washington, D.C.